Daumantas (Ruthenian: Dowmont or Domont;) is a given name and a surname. 

It is the name of two early dukes of Grand Duchy of Lithuania. Because they were contemporaries, they are often confused with each other.

Given name
 Daumantas of Lithuania, Grand Duke of Lithuania (1282–1285)
 Daumantas of Pskov, Prince of Pskov (1266–1299)
 Daumantas,  nom de guerre of Juozas Lukša, post-World War II anti-Soviet Lithuanian partisan leader

Surname
Juozas Lukša-Daumantas (1921-1951), Lithuanian anti-Soviet resistance fighter 
 Tomas Daumantas (born 1975), Lithuanian footballer
 (1885-1977), Lithuanian politician, diplomat,  bibliophile and collector

See also
Domantas, given name

Lithuanian masculine given names
Lithuanian-language surnames